Stream is an upcoming horror film directed, co-written and co-produced by Michael Leavy. It stars Jeffrey Combs, Danielle Harris, Dee Wallace, Tim Reid, Mark Holton, Felissa Rose, Tony Todd, Daniel Roebuck, Dave Sheridan, Terry Alexander, Damian Maffei and David Howard Thornton. Several producers and crew members for Stream, including director Leavy, were previously involved with the productions of the 2016 film Terrifier and its sequel Terrifier 2.

Stream is being financed in part by a crowdfunding campaign on the website Indiegogo. To date they have raised over $120,000 from the support of horror fans around the world. Using the hashtag #JoinTheStream to spread the word.

Premise

Cast

Production
Several producers and crew members for Stream were previously involved with the productions of the 2016 slasher film Terrifier and its upcoming sequel Terrifier 2. These include Stream director Michael Leavy, who appears in an acting role in Terrifier and serves as a producer and assistant director for Terrifier 2; David Howard Thornton, who played Art the Clown in the Terrifier films; Damien Leone, director of Terrifier and Terrifier 2, who served as the head of the special makeup effects department for Stream; Jason Leavy and Steven Della Salla, who played cops in the original “Terrifier” and Co-Producers on “Terrifier 2”,. According to director Leavy, "We went right into production after completing Terrifier 2, with pretty much the same crew [...]".

In September 2021, director Michael Leavy stated that "over 90% of the movie is already shot and in the can. It's currently in post-production, but due to the [COVID-19] pandemic there were a lot of unforeseen expenses we didn't initially plan for in order to keep everyone safe and work efficiently." Leavy went on to say that he and his team “felt that this was the perfect opportunity to offer fellow horror fans a chance to come on board with them to help create something fresh and new for the horror genre”  As a result, the filmmakers launched a crowdfunding campaign on the website Indiegogo to help finance the remainder of the film.

References

External links
 

Upcoming English-language films
American horror films
Films impacted by the COVID-19 pandemic